Keysoe is a village and former civil parish, now in the parish of Bolnhurst and Keysoe, in the Bedford district, in the ceremonial county of Bedfordshire, England. In 1931 the parish had a population of 432. On 1 April 1934 the parish was abolished to form "Bolnhurst and Keysoe".

Historically part of the Stodden hundred in Bedfordshire, part of Keysoe was originally located in Huntingdonshire.

The Church of St Mary the Virgin is located in the village.

The Keysoe International equestrian centre is based in Keysoe. The centre is a club and venue for horse sport events and training. The venue was used by equestrian teams training for the 2012 Summer Olympics and 2012 Summer Paralympics. 15 teams from around the world used Bedford Borough as their training base in preparation for the games.

Notable residents
 Edward Hull, illustrator and watercolour painter, born in Keysoe in 1823 
 William Hull, watercolour painter who lived in Keysoe during the 1820s

References

External links
Keysoe and Bolnhurst parish website

Villages in Bedfordshire
Former civil parishes in Bedfordshire
Borough of Bedford